Mircea Răceanu (born Mircea Bernat October 17, 1935) is a Romanian diplomat.

Early life
His parents were two Transylvanian members of the underground Romanian Communist Party (PCR) in the 1930s: a Romanian worker named Ileana Pop and a Jewish carpenter named Andrei Bernat, who was killed at Rîbnița by Fascists in 1944. Mircea was born in Văcărești Prison, where his mother was sentenced for Communist activities. After World War II, his mother married another old-time Communist, Grigore Răceanu.

Diplomatic career
Răceanu started work at a department which dealt with the Romania–United States relations, and with time he was named the chief of this department. In 1969, he started working at the Embassy of Romania in Washington, D.C. and, between 1974 and 1979, he was the first secretary in the same embassy. After returning to Romania, he was the chief of the North America department, which dealt with the United States and Canada. Between 1982 and January 1989, he was the chief of diplomacy department which dealt with the relations with all the countries of the Americas.

While in the United States, Răceanu became an American secret agent, giving information from an insider's point-of-view on the politics of Romania and information on human rights and religious freedom. He said that he sent no national security or military information and that he betrayed his ruler, but not his country. Răceanu further stated that, during a talk with Rabbi Arthur Schneier, Nicolae Ceaușescu said that he did not actually leak any real secrets, but "betrayed me personally".

In 1989, a group of six former Romanian Communist officials, including his stepfather, Grigore Răceanu, signed an open letter which was a critique of Ceaușescu's policies. Mircea Răceanu was arrested for treason on January 31, 1989, but this fact was disclosed only six weeks later (after the letter was published), when it was announced by the Government press agency Agerpres. He was accused of being involved in espionage for the United States since 1974, when he was a secretary in the Embassy of Romania in Washington, but also of links with the Perestroika-led Soviet Union. He was sentenced to death in July 1989, but in September, Ceaușescu commuted the sentence to 20 years of prison.

After the Revolution
After the revolution, he criticized the policies of the National Salvation Front, declaring to the New York Times that: "It is not over. There is still censorship of the press, and also of radio and television." He also spoke at several political rallies, including one in Bucharest and another at the border with Soviet Moldavia, claiming that the aides of Ceaușescu still held the key positions in the new government.

Silviu Brucan, a member of the National Salvation Front, said that he went to the U.S. Embassy in Romania and told a political officer that it would be best if Răceanu would leave for the United States. In the following days, according to Răceanu's declarations, there were two attempts to kill him, after which he decided to move to the United States.

Mircea Răceanu settled in a Washington, D.C. suburb and became an American citizen in 1992. In 1993, the Romanian court announced that his sentence was still valid, as that he was illegally released in 1989. Six years later, on June 11, 1999, a group of Romanian intellectuals asked that his sentence be overturned because Răceanu was an "anti-Communist fighter"; however, the sentence was reaffirmed, while the deputy attorney general declared that it was "impossible to rehabilitate Mircea Răceanu". A year later, Romania's supreme court of Justice, the High Court of Cassation and Justice, annulled the sentence and cleared Răceanu of all the accusations. He was awarded the National Order of Merit in 2002 by President Ion Iliescu for "helping Romania become a democracy".

Publications
In 2000, a book of his titled Infern '89 had a list of the Securitate members among the Romanian diplomats. In 2005, he published in Romania a book named Cronologie comentată a relațiilor româno-americane, which is a history of relations between Romania and the United States.

Romania Versus the United States: Diplomacy of the Absurd, 1985-1989, with Roger Kirk; Palgrave Macmillan (1994) 
România împotriva Statelor Unite: Diplomaţia absurdului, 1895-1989, Silex, Bucharest (1995)  (Translation)
Infern '89: povestea unui condamnat la moarte Silex, Bucharest (2000) 
 Silex, Bucharest, (2005)

References

1935 births
Living people
Diplomats from Bucharest
Prisoners sentenced to death by Romania
American people of Romanian-Jewish descent
Romanian emigrants to the United States
Romanian communists
Romanian essayists
Moscow State Institute of International Relations alumni
American spies
Cold War spies
Recipients of the National Order of Merit (Romania)
Romanian prisoners sentenced to death